Kirksville is a city in Adair County, Missouri, United States.

Kirksville may also refer to:

Kirksville, Indiana, United States
Kirksville, Illinois, United States
Kirksville, Kentucky, United States